The 2009 Bahraini Crown Prince Cup was the 9th edition of the cup tournament in men's association football. It is played by the top-4 teams of the Bahrain Classification Soccer League 2008-09 season. 

Muharraq Club were the holders and defending champions for the last three seasons and once again added to their trophy cabinet making it four wins in a row

2009 Participants
 Muharraq Club : Bahrain Classification Soccer League 2008-09 Champion
 Bahrain Riffa Club : Bahrain Classification Soccer League 2008-09 Runner Up
 Al-Ahli (Manama) : Bahrain Classification Soccer League 2008-09 3rd Place
 East Riffa Club : Bahrain Classification Soccer League 2008-09 4th Place

Bracket

Matches

Semi-finals

Final 

 

Bahraini Crown Prince Cup seasons
2009 domestic association football cups
2008–09 in Bahraini football